The 1945 South American Championships in Athletics  were held in the Uruguayan capital, Montevideo, between 15 and 22 April.

Medal summary

Men's events

Women's events

Medal table

External links
 Men Results – GBR Athletics
 Women Results – GBR Athletics
 Medallists

S
South American Championships in Athletics
1945 in South American sport
International athletics competitions hosted by Uruguay
1945 in Uruguayan sport